Jen McClanaghan is an American poet. She won the 2009 Georgetown Review Prize.

McClanaghan grew up in New Canaan, Connecticut and earned her bachelor's degree from Antioch College. She earned her MFA from Columbia University in 2004 and her PhD from Florida State University in 2009. Since 2005 she has published over thirty poems, some of which have been published in the Iowa Review, the New England Review, and the Indiana Review, among others. Her manuscript, The Cairo Letters, was a finalist for The National Poetry Series, Saturnalia Books, Autumn House Press, and The Dorset Prize.

She lives in Baton Rouge, Louisiana, where she is a resident scholar at The Southern Review and teaches in the LSU English Department.

External links
 Author's Website
 Poem: The Missouri Review > July 2008 > "Your Own Private Oil Spill"
 Author Page, Poets & Writers Directory

Columbia University School of the Arts alumni
American women poets
Living people
Year of birth missing (living people)
People from New Canaan, Connecticut
Florida State University alumni
Writers from Baton Rouge, Louisiana
Antioch College alumni
Louisiana State University faculty
21st-century American poets
21st-century American women writers
American women academics